The Rain prayer ("rain request prayer") is a sunnah salah (Islamic prayer) for requesting and seeking rain water from God.

Presentation
Muslim prophetic tradition has reported that on a certain exceptional occasion, while there had been a prolonged drought, a man came to Muhammad as he was delivering the Khutba (sermon) of the Friday prayer in the Al-Masjid an-Nabawi mosque, to pray and implore for the rain to fall, for the men and the cattle and the orchards suffered from the lack of water, and in response, Muhammad raised his hands for the Dua and prayed to God to make it rain a downpour.

Likewise, when his supplication was answered and the torrential rain lasted for whole days, Muhammad again prayed to God and implored him for the precipitation to cease because there was an excess of rain which then caused damage.

On another reported occasion, Muhammad walked out of the mosque in broad daylight into an esplanade with the congregation of priors, and allegedly prayed for the rain to fall, then performed a prayer consisting of two rak'ahs as a group while reading Al-Fatiha aloud, as he does in Friday prayer.

Evidence in Quran

Evidence in Hadiths
Offering prayers for rain is Sunnah, as confirmed by sahih hadiths and the practice of the early generations of Islam.

`Abbad ibn Tamim's uncle narrated: 

Ishaaq ibn Abdillah ibn Kinaanah said: 

`Abbad bin Tamim from his uncle narrated:

Ritual

In Muslim agricultural societies, in times of calamity such as drought, the Imam is asked to provide spiritual help to the community in the hope of inducing God to fall rain.

Indeed, the farmers regard the rain as a great divine blessing, and every time it rains showers, people rejoice and thank God Almighty.

These Muslim farmers have their livelihoods depending mainly on agriculture, and if it does not rain on time, it means that there will be insufficient harvest, and this causes a lot of worry and anxiety.

Practice
On the day fixed to perform this prayer, the Imam of the mosque mobilizes the faithful to perform this ritual with him collectively to implore God to give them enough rain for the agricultural season and for human drinking needs, and personal hygiene.

This prayer ritual takes place in the same open space outside the mosque where the two Eid prayers are held annually according to similar principles.

References

Salah
Salah terminology